Reginald Murray may refer to:

 Reg Murray (1909–1962), Australian politician
 Reginald Augustus Frederick Murray (1846–1925), Australian geologist